Cambria is an unincorporated community in Blue Earth County, in the U.S. state of Minnesota.

History
Cambira was platted in 1900. The community took its name from Cambria Township.

A post office was established at Cambria in 1881, closed in 1882, reopened in 1901, and closed permanently in 1967.

References

Unincorporated communities in Blue Earth County, Minnesota
Unincorporated communities in Minnesota